Osem may refer to:

 Osem (mathematics) – algorithm for image reconstruction in nuclear medical imaging
 Osem (company) – Israeli food corporation

 Orquesta Sinfonica del Estado de Mexico, an official State symphony orchestra in Mexico.